Dylan Murnane (born 18 January 1995) is an Australian football (soccer) player who plays as a left back.

Club career
In 2012, Murnane was a member of the Port Melbourne SC side that won promotion to the Victorian Premier League and reached the final of the State Knockout Cup, before he was recruited by the Melbourne Victory Youth team.

After initially joining the club as member of the youth team in late 2012, Murnane made his professional debut with home town giants Melbourne Victory against Sydney in a 1–1 draw at Sydney Football Stadium in March 2013. He made his home debut and second appearance in a 2–3 loss against Perth Glory at AAMI Park. During the 2013/14 season he signed a contract extension with Victory that would take him through to the end of the 2015/16 season.

Murnane was released by Melbourne Victory on 28 May 2016.

On 13 September 2016 he signed a contract with the Norwegian club Kongsvinger IL Toppfotball.

In December 2017, Murnane signed for Finnish Veikkausliiga side IFK Mariehamn on a 2-year-contract with option for a third season.

In August 2021, Murnane returned to Australia, joining A-League club Newcastle Jets.

International career
In August 2013, Murnane was called up to the Young Socceroos squad for the L'Alcúdia International Football Tournament alongside Victory team-mates Christopher Cristaldo and Luke Radonich.

In 2014, he was named in the squad for the 2014 AFC U-19 Championship although he did not make any appearances at the tournament as Australia was knocked out at the group stage.

References

External links
 

1995 births
Living people
Soccer players from Melbourne
Australian people of Italian descent
Australian soccer players
Association football defenders
A-League Men players
Melbourne Victory FC players
Port Melbourne SC players
Australian expatriate soccer players
Expatriate footballers in Norway
Australian expatriate sportspeople in Norway
Kongsvinger IL Toppfotball players
Norwegian First Division players
Expatriate footballers in Finland
Australian expatriate sportspeople in Finland
IFK Mariehamn players
Helsingin Jalkapalloklubi players
Veikkausliiga players
Newcastle Jets FC players